Dane Willard Boedigheimer (born September 28, 1978), better known by his stage name DaneBoe, is an American Internet personality, voice actor, writer, and animator. He is known for creating the web series The Annoying Orange and the spin-off television series The High Fructose Adventures of Annoying Orange; he provides the voice of the title character in both productions.

Boedigheimer began making videos with his 8mm camcorder as a teenager. Boedigheimer was a speech communications major at Minnesota State University Moorhead, and became a production assistant for MTV's Pimp My Ride three years after earning his degree. He later founded the company Gagfilms in 2005.

The talking food videos Boedigheimer had previously done for JibJab inspired and prepared him to create the first original Annoying Orange video. Due to the success of the video, he began creating more, and ultimately became an online YouTube franchise. The success of the Annoying Orange series has been parlayed into a spin-off television series, a video game, a range of toys, a clothing line, and costumes.

Biography

Early interest in filmmaking
Boedigheimer was born on September 28, 1978 in Minnesota to Peter (1953-2008) and Julie Boedigheimer. His father was a roofer. Boedigheimer has a younger brother, Lucas. He was raised in Harwood, North Dakota, where he frequently made home videos as a teen, since he began using his parents' 8mm video camera that he got for Christmas at the age of 12; "I was spending entire days making short videos with my younger brother. It all just blossomed from there. I remember sitting in my room for hours editing my videos with two VCRs. It was painstaking, but I loved it. There was something magical about making stories come to life right in front of my eyes, no matter how crappy those stories were!" This would later inspire him to work as a camera operator for local TV stations. 

The first movie he ever did was a joint effort with his little brother called "Pugzilla." The movie featured a toy barnyard set and some Matchbox cars which would be damaged by the brother's dog, Pugsly. Boedigheimer stated "Pretty soon I started realizing maybe I could actually do this for a living." Boedigheimer attended West Fargo High School where he graduated in 1997.

Education at MSUM
During his college years, he studied filmmaking at Minnesota State University Moorhead between 1998–2003, where he met Spencer Grove as an undergraduate. He was a major in speech communications with an emphasis in film studies, which he said to be a preparation for the creation of the Annoying Orange; "The program (at MSUM) was very small when I was there, and you had to make things work with a small budget. I think that experience actually kind of helped." He also worked at a one-hour photo lab during his college years, stating "I only got in on one shoot, so that was the extent of that".

MSUM Professor Greg Carlson, who had Boedigheimer as a student in three of his classes, was impressed by how down-to-earth Boedigheimer was in school, and considered him "a tremendously friendly, genuine and easy-going guy". He also said, "Dane just had a total exuberance for wanting to create stuff. You asked for one thing from him, he gives you three. He's that kind of person."

One of his final projects at MSUM, a full-length feature film titled Trash TV, was shown at the Fargo Theatre, where there were more than 200 people who showed up to watch their movie. Boedigheimer describes the film as a clip show, with spoofs of commercials and movies.

Career beginnings
After finishing college, Boedigheimer, his girlfriend, and Grove moved to Bakersfield, California, and then in 2004, upon Grove's recommendation, moved to Los Angeles, where, between October 2004 and December 2005, they both worked as production assistants for MTV's Pimp My Ride, with Dane earning $700 a week. However, the 60- and 80-hour workweeks would allow little to no time to do his movie-making at home. After finishing working for the show, Dane decided that he didn't want to pursue a career in television; "It wasn't me", said Dane. "I wanted to be creative and do things my own way."

On Valentine's Day 2005, Boedigheimer founded the company Gagfilms, which slowly built a core of fans. In 2006, in which he became a freelance filmmaker in January of that same year, he opened two YouTube channels named Daneboe and Gagfilms, producing several video series. He was also a multimedia reporter at The Bakersfield Californian during this time, between June 2006 and August 2007.

The Annoying Orange
Before The Annoying Orange, Boedigheimer had done many talking food videos for his channel and other sites including JibJab (2005–2008). He said in an interview that the idea for The Annoying Orange was a combination of the talking food videos, puns and special effects he came up with and did before.

The original video was planned to be titled The Annoying Apple, but when he started animating the video he figured it would be easier to put features on an orange than an apple and make it more visible. It was also initially meant to be the only Annoying Orange video on YouTube. However, as the video became popular, many viewers requested more videos, and after the 4th episode, Boedigheimer decided to make it a full-time series. Following the success of the series, he created a channel dedicated to The Annoying Orange under the name "realannoyingorange" on January 31, 2010.
The success of the series would also receive the attention of Fargo advertising agency H2M, who, in 2006, created its own "Talking Orange", which is the spokesman for an ad campaign for the North Dakota Department of Transportation. Both of the two characters were two anthropomorphic oranges with ties to the Fargo-Moorhead area. Despite only slightly resembling the "Talking Orange", the Annoying Orange was looked by H2M's attorneys into the matter as an intellectual property issue. Boedigheimer stated of not watching the "Talking Orange" videos before he was told about the disagreement, also believing that the characters were not very similar.

New episodes of The Annoying Orange are released on a weekly basis, with a few exceptions. The episodes are released every Friday on realannoyingorange's YouTube channel, now the official Annoying Orange channel.

Other works
Besides the Annoying Orange, Boedigheimer, along with his friends, created other shows. One of the shows he created on his channel was called Thunder McWylde. It is a cartoon series that premiered on October 10, 2013, and it revolves around Thunder McWylde, a retired street fighter who is trying to live a normal life, but who is too strong for his own good.

Along with Rob Jennings, he created another cartoon series on The Annoying Orange YouTube channel called The Misfortune of Being Ned. Premiering on October 9, 2013, and ending on April 23, 2014, the show's plot revolves around Ned, a cheerful elementary school kid who encounters a lot of bad situations.

Boedigheimer has done two animated videos. The first one was for his song "Stuck in an Emo Band", and the second one was for a story called "Stuck in a Bank". The animation for both his videos was done by his good friend Rebecca Parham, who runs the YouTube channel Let Me Explain Studios.

Awards and reception
In 2006, Boedigheimer's movie short, titled "Eggs," won top honors at Bolt.com's 1-Minute Film Festival. The video was conceived when he was cooking with his girlfriend in their Ming Avenue apartment. He later used the $5,000 award for a new camera.

Dane's videos have been viewed over 500 million times and have been featured on TV, popular entertainment, news, and video sharing websites. In 2010, Boedigheimer's YouTube channel had almost 350 million views and earned an income of $288,000 from ads.

Due to the success from the television version of The Annoying Orange, Boedigheimer was also one of the final presenters of the 64th Primetime Creative Arts Emmy Awards.

Personal life 
Boedigheimer married Theresa Barket, a frequent collaborator in his videos, in 2012. They live in Sierra Madre, California.

Filmography

References

External links

1978 births
Living people
American male voice actors
Minnesota State University Moorhead alumni
People from Cass County, North Dakota
People from Minnesota
Male actors from Riverside, California
The Annoying Orange
American YouTubers